Sartidia perrieri is a grass species endemic to Madagascar, known from only one collected individual and now considered extinct.

He wrote in the description of the dried herbarium specimen that he only ever saw one individual of this species, suggesting it was already very rare at that time. Aimée Antoinette Camus named it after its collector and described it as new species in the genus Aristida; Pierre Bourreil later transferred it to Sartidia.

Sartidia perrieri is a tuft-forming grass. With its clusters of large spikelets, it is very different from the only other known Sartidia species from Madagascar, S. isaloensis.

In 2014, biologists were able to sequence chloroplast and nuclear DNA from the 100-year-old type specimen and confirmed its placement in Sartidia with molecular phylogenetics. It was closer to Southern African species than to S. isaloensis, suggesting the two species descend from lineages that colonised Madagascar independently.

No other individual of Sartidia perrieri has been found since the original collection, and the species was accordingly assessed as extinct in the wild. It was suggested that pressure from grazing and agricultural expansion was already high at the time when Perrier de la Bâthie collected the plant. Wooded savannas may have been replaced by open, C grass-dominated grasslands, leading to the loss of habitats suitable to C grasses like S. perrieri''.

References

Aristidoideae
Extinct plants
Endemic flora of Madagascar
Taxa named by Aimée Antoinette Camus